Neetu Singh (born 26 November 1990) is a model and Punjabi actress. She  won Miss PTC Punjabi in 2008 and soon after was in the music video "Call Jalandhar Ton" by Harbhajan Maan. Her first film appearance was in 2012 in Dil Tainu Karda Ae Pyaar  with Gulzar Inder Chahal. She also appeared in Saadi Love Story, released in January 2013, the Bollywood heist film, Special 26, released in February 2013, Ji Karda (2014) and Sardar Saab (2017).

In an interview with The Times of India, Singh said she was very clear about her future. She said she had finished modeling and would prefer acting for Punjabi cinema over Bollywood cinema. Her final ambition is to go into politics.

Filmography

References

Living people
Indian film actresses
Indian Sikhs
Actresses in Hindi cinema
Actresses in Punjabi cinema
1991 births